The World Group was the highest level of Fed Cup competition in 2009. Eight nations competed in a three-round knockout competition. Russia was the two-time defending champion, but they were defeated by Italy in the semifinals. The Italian team went on to win, defeating the United States in the final, 4–0.

Participating Teams

Draw

First round

Russia vs. China

France vs. Italy

United States vs. Argentina

Czech Republic vs. Spain

Semifinals

Russia vs. Italy

United States vs. Czech Republic

Final

Italy vs. United States

References

See also
Fed Cup structure

World